A list of films produced by the Israeli film industry in 1950.

1950 releases

See also
1950 in Israel

References

External links
 Israeli films of 1950 at the Internet Movie Database

Israeli
Film
1950